Lee Hyden Rose (October 23, 1936 – April 5, 2022) was an American basketball coach and college athletic administrator.  He served as the head men's basketball at Transylvania University, in an interim capacity in 1964–65 and on a permanent basis from 1968 to 1975; the University of North Carolina at Charlotte from 1975 to 1978; Purdue University from 1978 to 1980; and the University of South Florida from 1980 to 1986, compiling a career college basketball coach record in 388–162. Rose twice coached teams to the Final Four of the  NCAA Division I basketball tournament, with Charlotte 49ers in 1977 and the Purdue Boilermakers in 1980.  After leaving the college ranks, Rose was an assistant coach with several teams in the National Basketball Association (NBA) between  1986 and 2008.

Collegiate coaching career
Rose, a native of Irvine, Kentucky, is a 1958 alumnus of Transylvania University where he served as an assistant coach after graduation under C. M. Newton. He then took a similar position at the University of Cincinnati before returning to his alma mater as head coach and athletic director and recorded 160 wins in eight seasons.

In 1975 he became the head coach and athletic director at UNC Charlotte, where in three seasons he took the 49ers to one NIT championship game (1976) and to the NCAA Final Four (1977). In 1977 he was named The Sporting News National Coach of the Year, the Sun Belt Coach of the Year, and Charlotte's "Citizen of the Year". In three seasons Rose's record at Charlotte was 72–18 (.800).

Rose left Charlotte for Purdue University in 1978 and led them to the Final Four in 1980, and is one of only ten coaches in NCAA history to take two different schools to the semifinals of the NCAA tournament. Rose left Purdue after two seasons after compiling a 50–18 (.735) record and finished his coaching career at the University of South Florida. He coached the Bulls to their first postseason appearances in team history, reaching the NIT three times.

Later career
After retiring from the college ranks in 1986 Rose served as an assistant coach for four NBA teams: the San Antonio Spurs (1986–1988); the New Jersey Nets (1988–1989); the Milwaukee Bucks (1991–1992), and the Charlotte Hornets (1996–2001). He also served as the Bucks' vice president of player personnel in the mid-1990s.

Rose and his wife resided in Charlotte, North Carolina, where they attended nearly every Charlotte 49ers basketball game. On June 7, 2007, Rose was hired by the Charlotte Bobcats to be part of head coach Sam Vincent's staff.
He has four grandchildren, Lee Rose; Kristi Rose; James Rose; and Alexzander Rose. 

Rose died on April 5, 2022, at age 85.

Head coaching record

Basketball

See also
 List of NCAA Division I Men's Final Four appearances by coach

References

External links
 

1936 births
2022 deaths
American men's basketball coaches
American men's basketball players
Basketball coaches from Kentucky
Basketball players from Kentucky
Charlotte 49ers athletic directors
Charlotte 49ers men's basketball coaches
Charlotte Hornets assistant coaches
Cincinnati Bearcats men's basketball coaches
Guards (basketball)
Milwaukee Bucks executives
Milwaukee Bucks assistant coaches
New Jersey Nets assistant coaches
People from Irvine, Kentucky
Purdue Boilermakers men's basketball coaches
San Antonio Spurs assistant coaches
South Florida Bulls men's basketball coaches
Transylvania Pioneers athletic directors
Transylvania Pioneers baseball coaches
Transylvania Pioneers baseball players
Transylvania Pioneers men's basketball coaches
Transylvania Pioneers men's basketball players